Richard Henry Clarke (February 9, 1843 – September 26, 1906) was a politician and U.S. Representative from Alabama.

Biography
Born in Dayton, Alabama, Clarke attended Green Springs Academy. He graduated from the University of Alabama at Tuscaloosa in July 1861.  He soon enlisted in the Confederate States Army, and during the Civil War was a lieutenant in the First Battalion of Alabama Artillery.

After the war, Clarke studied law and passed the bar in 1867; he commenced practice in Dayton, Alabama.

He moved to Demopolis, Alabama, and continued to work as a lawyer. There he was elected as State Solicitor for Marengo County, serving 1872-1876. He was prosecuting attorney of the seventh judicial circuit in 1876 and 1877.

He moved to Mobile, Alabama, where he resumed a law practice.

Marriage and family

In 1877 he married Helen Gaines Foot, a native of Mobile. Her father, C. K. Foot, was a native of Vermont, and a descendant of Nathaniel Foot, one of the early settlers of Wethersfield, Connecticut. Her mother was Sarah Lyons, of Mobile, of the distinguished Pendleton and Gaines families. His wife spent her early years in Mobile, but she later attended school in New York City.

Their daughters, Helen Gaines and Mary Morris Clarke, resembled their mother in face and manner.

Later political career
Clarke was elected as a Democrat from Alabama's 1st congressional district to the Fifty-first and to the three succeeding Congresses (March 4, 1889 – March 3, 1897). He was not a candidate for renomination, as he ran in 1896 for governor. He was not successful.

Clarke resumed the practice of law in Mobile. He was elected to the State House of Representatives in 1900 and 1901.

He died in St. Louis, Missouri, on September 26, 1906. His body was returned to Mobile, where he was buried in Magnolia Cemetery.

References

Specific

External links

1843 births
1906 deaths
People from Demopolis, Alabama
Confederate States Army officers
Democratic Party members of the United States House of Representatives from Alabama
19th-century American politicians